Guido Gonzaga (1290 – 22 September 1369) was an Italian condottiero, son of Ludovico I Gonzaga capitano del popolo of Mantua and imperial vicar.

Biography
He was elected podestà of Mantua in 1328, as well as of Reggio Emilia. In 1335 he became lord of the latter city.

In 1360 he became the second capitano del popolo in Mantua, having been appointed to that position at an old age (70), together with his son  Ugolino, who most likely held the effective power until his assassination (14 October 1362) by the brothers Francesco and Ludovico. He was in charge in 1368 when Mantua was occupied by Barnabò Visconti, although the city was freed through the intervention of emperor Charles IV. With the peace of Bologna, Mantua obtained the lands of Cavriana, Castiglione delle Stiviere, Solferino, Volta, Medole and Ceresara.

He died in 1369 and was succeeded by his son, by Beatrix of Bar, Ludovico II in the city's government.

1290 births
1369 deaths
Guido
14th-century condottieri
Lords of Mantua
Burials in the Cappella Gonzaga, San Francesco, Mantua